Auldhame Castle is a ruined L-plan tower house standing on a ridge above Seacliff beach, about 3 miles east of North Berwick in East Lothian, and less than half a mile from Tantallon Castle. The castle was built in the 16th century, probably by Adam Otterburn of Reidhall, Lord Provost of Edinburgh. It consists of a three-storey main block with a projecting stair-tower. Part of a vaulted basement remains, but the upper floors are mostly gone.

One of the three supposed corpses of Saint Baldred of Tyninghame was said to have been buried at the site in 756. A cemetery site in an adjoining field was excavated in 2008, the remains of at least 326 individual skeletons were noted, plus the foundations of a probable chapel with an estimated 9th century date (based on comparisons with similar structures).

See also
List of castles in Scotland
Auldhame & Scoughall

References

History of Auldhame Castle

Ruined castles in East Lothian
North Berwick
Tower houses in Scotland